Berezovka is a rural locality (a settlement) and the administrative center of Mylinskoye Rural Settlement, Karachevsky District, Bryansk Oblast, Russia. The population was 815 as of 2010. There are 10 streets.

Geography 
Berezovka is located 11 km northwest of Karachev (the district's administrative centre) by road. Khokhlovka is the nearest rural locality.

References 

Rural localities in Karachevsky District